This is a list of 19th-century women politicians. The term politician refer to members of the modern political system, such as members of political partiers, city councillors and similar positions, and therefore does not include women monarchs and regents.

China
 
 Fu Shanxiang

Europe
 Ottilie Pohl
 
 Ingibjörg H. Bjarnason
 Kristín Bjarnadóttir
 Þórunn Jónassen
 Suzanne Voilquin
 Léonie Rouzade
 Blanche Lefebvre
 Mary Clifford
 Anna Boschek
 Cornélie Huygens
 Elisabeth Dmitrieff
 Désirée Gay
 Joana Griniuvienė
 Jaquette Liljencrantz
 Gunhild Ziener

India
 Mah Laqa Bai
 Jhalkaribai
 Annie Besant

United States
 Julia Addington
 Martha Hughes Cannon
 Susanna M. Salter
 Elizabeth Yates (mayor)

+
Lists of women